HMS Loosestrife (K105) was a  of the Royal Navy which sailed with the North Atlantic convoys of the Second World War.

Construction
Loosestrife was ordered from Hall, Russell & Company in 1939. She was laid down in December 1940 and launched on 25 August 1941. She was commissioned on 25 November 1941.

Career

Loosestrife sailed with Convoy ONS 5 (outward, northbound, slow) from Britain to North America in 1943. The convoy was made up of 42 ships, of which 12 or 13 were sunk after the convoy came under sustained attack from German submarines hunting in packs. Fifteen of the 44 people on board died. Manke attacked and damaged  not long after. Loosestrife picked up the survivors from both sinkings who were landed at St. Johns in Newfoundland.

On 6 May 1943, Loosestrife sank German submarine  in the North Atlantic south-east of Cape Farewell using depth charges (Lt.  Herbert Arthur Stonehouse, RNR, commander). The entire crew of 55 died.

On 4 October 1946, Loosestrife was sold. She subsequently became the merchantman Kallsevni in 1947.

References

Publications
 

1941 ships
Flower-class corvettes of the Royal Navy
Ships built by Hall, Russell & Company